Frames of Reference is a 1960 black-and-white educational film directed by Richard Leacock, written and presented by Patterson Hume and Donald Ivey, and produced for the Physical Science Study Committee.

Synopsis
The film was made to be shown in high school physics courses and humor is employed both to hold students' interest and to demonstrate the concepts being discussed. In the film, University of Toronto physics professors Patterson Hume and Donald Ivey explain the distinction between inertial and noninertial frames of reference, while demonstrating these concepts through humorous camera tricks. For example, the film opens with Dr. Hume, who appears to be upside down, accusing Dr. Ivey of being upside down. Only when the pair flip a coin and it floats up does it become obvious that Dr. Ivey — and the camera — are indeed inverted.

References

External links
Frames of Reference (1960). Internet Archive.

Canadian short documentary films
Documentary films about science
1960 documentary films
1960 short films
1960s English-language films
Educational materials
Canadian black-and-white films
1960s educational films
1960s Canadian films
Canadian educational films
1960s short documentary films